The year 1993 is the 5th year in the history of Shooto, a mixed martial arts promotion based in the Japan. In 1993 Shooto held 4 events beginning with, Shooto: Shooto.

Events list

Shooto: Shooto

Shooto: Shooto was an event held on February 26, 1993, at Korakuen Hall in Tokyo, Japan.

Results

Shooto: Shooto

Shooto: Shooto was an event held on April 26, 1993, at Korakuen Hall in Tokyo, Japan.

Results

Shooto: Shooto

Shooto: Shooto was an event held on June 24, 1993, at Korakuen Hall in Tokyo, Japan.

Results

Shooto: Shooto

Shooto: Shooto was an event held on November 25, 1993, at Korakuen Hall in Tokyo, Japan.

Results

See also 
 Shooto
 List of Shooto champions
 List of Shooto Events

References

Shooto events
1993 in mixed martial arts